Woodland Beach Wildlife Area is a state wildlife area located in Kent County, Delaware, along shore of the Delaware Bay.

Much of the area is a transgressive brackish marsh.

The Thomas Sutton House serves as a residence and office for the personnel of the Woodland Beach Wildlife Area. It was listed on the National Register of Historic Places in 1973.

References

Protected areas of Delaware
Protected areas of Kent County, Delaware